Scopula indicataria  is a moth of the  family Geometridae. It is found in China, Korea, Japan and Russia.

Subspecies
Scopula indicataria indicataria (eastern and southern China)
Scopula indicataria sufflava (Prout, 1938) (northern and north-eastern China to Korea, Japan and Russia: Amur, Primorye)
Scopula indicataria morata (Prout, 1938) (Japan)

References

Moths described in 1861
indicataria
Moths of Asia